Morris Light Reconnaissance Car (LRC) was a British light armoured car for reconnaissance use produced by Morris Motors Limited and used by the British during the Second World War.

The Nuffield Group had been brought in to supplement production of light reconnaissance cars by Standard Motor Company (Beaverette) and Humber (Humber LAC, also known as "Humberette").

The vehicle had an unusual internal arrangement, with the three-man crew sitting side by side by side with the driver in the middle, a crewman manning a small multi-sided turret mounting a Bren light machine gun on the right, and another with a Boys anti-tank rifle (mounted in brackets in the hatches on the hull roof) and access to radio set on the left. From 1940 to 1944, over 2,200 were built.

The vehicle was used in the North African, Italian and in North-West Europe campaigns. Some served with the RAF Regiment, others were given to Polish units.

One of the surviving vehicles is on display at the Imperial War Museum Duxford, another at The Tank Museum, Bovington, and another at the Military Museum at Port Dickson, Malaysia.

Variants
Mk I - original version.
Mk I OP - observation post version. No turret. Equipped with two rangefinders.
Mk II - four-by-four chassis.
Morris Experimental Tank - had two turrets. Never reached production.
Firefly - an experiment by Morris to use 6 pounder guns from the period before the tanks became available to mount them. A 57 mm QF 6 pounder anti-tank gun was mounted in the front of the hull. It was rejected.
Salamander - A narrow two seat version of the Morris LRC with a turret on top. Prototype built but no production.
Glanville Fighter Car - A one-seat version of the Morris LRC with two fixed machine guns. Prototype built but no production.

Notes

References

Great Britain's Morris Mk II Reconnaissance Car wwiivehicles.com

External links

Warwheels.net
Morris LRC website

World War II armoured cars
World War II armoured fighting vehicles of the United Kingdom
Reconnaissance vehicles of the United Kingdom
Armoured cars of the United Kingdom
Military vehicles introduced from 1940 to 1944